Her Royal Harness is the musical moniker of Helene Jæger, an alternative rock / pop singer-songwriter from Bergen, Norway. Jæger's music has been characterized by its melancholy lyrical world centering on themes of isolation and being lost to yourself, uniting the "ghosts of rocks", Baroque Europe, dance music and gospel.

Career
Jæger's debut album "The Hunting Room" (mixed with Justin Gerrish -Vampire Weekend, The Strokes) was released on independent label Manufacture in 2013, to critical acclaim. The Sunday Times called lead single 'Unseen' "brilliant" and UK music magazine The 405 called the album: "A dazzling and confident debut from a band who could find themselves among the leading lights of off-kilter pop". The album was also named "Best New Release" by Classic Pop Magazine and lead single 'Unseen' was hailed as "one of the year's most enjoyable songs" by US entertainment tastemaker The A.V. Club Several tracks were picked up by radio stations such as XFM in the UK and charted on CMJ, garnering the project an underground following.

References

Further reading
http://www.hungertv.com/feature/her-royal-harness-unseen/
http://www.glamourmagazine.co.uk/celebrity/entertainment/monitor/2013/06/her-royal-harness-interview-bio-the-hunting-room
http://www.philthymag.com/her-royal-harness-music-for-moving-the-masses/
http://www.classicpopmag.com/tag/her-royal-harness/
https://web.archive.org/web/20140810083018/http://schonmagazine.com/2013/06/8497/

External links

Norwegian rock singers
Living people
Year of birth missing (living people)